Thrill may refer to:

Music
 Thrill, a 2000 album by Eleni Mandell
 "Thrill", a 1995 song by Tomoyasu Hotei
 "Thrill", a song by Band-Maid from the 2015 album New Beginning

Other uses
 Thrill (TV channel), a Southeast Asian movie channel
 Thrill, a 1996 made-for-TV movie by Sam Pillsbury
 Thrill!, a 1998 novel by Jackie Collins
 Thrill,  a discontinued Procter & Gamble brand of dishwashing liquid
 Thrill, a quality of a heart murmur

See also
 
 
 Thrills (disambiguation)
 Thriller (disambiguation)
 Thrillseeker (disambiguation)
 Frill (disambiguation)
 Trill (disambiguation)